Danny Lipford (born May 29, 1957) is an American contractor and television personality  known to audiences as Host and Executive Producer of the nationally syndicated home improvement television and radio shows, Today's Homeowner with Danny Lipford, and for his appearances on The Weather Channel, and CBS's The Early Show.

Construction career
Lipford was born in Marianna, Florida.  At the age of 9, Danny got the home improvement bug and bought his first tool, a jigsaw from a mail order catalogue. He moved to Mobile, Alabama in 1975 to attend the University of South Alabama but his side job as a handyman turned into a full-time passion.  In 1978, he started his remodeling business, Lipford Construction, which celebrated its 40th anniversary in 2018.

Today's Homeowner with Danny Lipford

The Weather Channel
In 2000, Lipford joined The Weather Channel as their home improvement expert.    In daily short segments broadcast throughout the week, he offered advice and guidance on a variety of home topics.  
  
Lipford also covered weather-related home topics for the Weather Channel including hurricane preparation tips, and recovering from a tornado.   He has also appeared live from across the country for special first day of the season broadcasts from Traverse City, Michigan, Fish Creek, Wisconsin, and other locations.

CBS This Morning
Lipford was the home improvement contributor to CBS This Morning, and its predecessor, The Early Show, for over a decade.  In short segments, he demonstrated a variety of how-to projects in the studio and on location and has appeared live from the floor of industry trade shows including the International Builders' Show, the Kitchen and Bath Show, and the National Hardware Show.

Better Homes and Gardens and Other Appearances
Lipford was a contributing editor to Better Homes and Gardens magazine and bhg.com starting in 2009, providing articles, columns and videos

Lipford also demonstrated spring cleaning tips on LIVE with Regis & Kelly, moderated "Thermostat Wars" on The Rachael Ray Show and shown how to hang Christmas lights safely on Inside Edition.  He has been a resource for magazines and newspapers ranging from Parade magazine to the Chicago Tribune.

References

External links
Official Site

1957 births
Living people
American talk radio hosts
People from Marianna, Florida
Television personalities from Florida